FK506-binding protein 2 is a protein that in humans is encoded by the FKBP2 gene.

Function 

The protein encoded by this gene is a member of the immunophilin protein family, which play a role in immunoregulation and basic cellular processes involving protein folding and trafficking. This encoded protein is a cis-trans prolyl isomerase that binds the immunosuppressants FK506 and rapamycin. It is thought to function as an ER chaperone and may also act as a component of membrane cytoskeletal scaffolds. This gene has two alternatively spliced transcript variants that encode the same isoform. Multiple polyadenylation sites have been described for this gene, but the full length nature of this gene has not been determined.

Interactions 

FKBP2 has been shown to interact with ARFGEF1 and EPB41L2.

References

Further reading 

 
 
 
 
 
 
 
 
 

EC 5.2.1